François "Franc" Tétaz (born 22 December 1970) is an Australian film composer, music producer and mixer, who won the Australasian Performing Right Association (APRA) / Australian Guild of Screen Composers (AGSC) 2006 'Feature Film Score of the Year' Award for Wolf Creek (2005).

As a producer he has worked with Gotye, Kimbra, Architecture in Helsinki, Sally Seltmann, Lior and Bertie Blackman. He won an ARIA for his work on Gotye's Making Mirrors album in 2011. He wrote, produced or mixed 7 songs in the triple j Hottest 100 for 2011.

Franc won the Grammy Award for Record of the Year at the 55th annual Grammy Awards for "Somebody That I Used to Know"  (Gotye, featuring Kimbra) in 2013.  The record was produced by Wally De Backer (Gotye) and engineered and mixed by Wally and Franc.  The song also won the Grammy Award for Best Pop Duo/Group Performance as performed by Gotye and Kimbra, and the Making Mirrors album took home the Grammy Award for Best Alternative Music Album.

Early life
Tétaz is of Swiss descent.
He grew up in a musical family on a dairy farm near Warrion, in the western district of Victoria. His mother, Heather was a music teacher; his father Frank was a dairy farmer and was obsessed with sound and music.  In the 1950s he designed and built speakers to broadcast music around the farm, herding cattle to a soundtrack of Brahms and Beethoven. The family moved to Geelong so Franc and his brother Charles could attend Geelong Grammar School.

Career

1992-1997: Early years
After finishing school, he worked in Faggs hardware store in Geelong. Graeme Leak, who was artist in residence at the Sydney Conservatorium of Music at the time, suggested to Franc that he not go to university, but put together his own curriculum.  While working, he sat in on a friend's university lectures and studied West African Music, percussion, arranging and orchestration.
In 1992, François Tétaz with Charles Tétaz and Darrin Verhagen formed Shinjuku Thief, a Melbourne-based industrial and experimental music group. They released four albums by March 1994. Verhagen formed the record label, Dorobo Records, to release their latter albums including Tétaz' solo album, The Motionless World of Time Between or the Drunken Taxicab of Absolute Reality in 1997.

He scored student short films, worked on production for Paul McDermott, and The Doug Anthony Allstars.

1998–present: Composition and production
In 1998, Tetaz built a studio in a converted chocolate factory in Richmond, Melbourne. The studio was designed by Martin Gill and Roger Wood at Wood Marsh.  The acoustics were designed by Chris Morton of Aro Technologies.  Franc's mastering discography includes Merzbow’s Merzbox 50 CD box set of noise music for Extreme and the remaster of classic Triffids album Born Sandy Devotional for Domino.

Francois wrote choreographic scores for Chunky Move, Shelley Lasica, Kage Theatre, Lucy Guerin and wrote the soundtrack for Patricia Piccinini’s Venice biennale show in 2003. He composed the score for Wolf Creek which won the Australasian Performing Right Association (APRA) / Australian Guild of Screen Composers (AGSC) 2006 'Feature Film Score of the Year' Award. He scored Luke Doolan’s short film Miracle Fish, which was nominated for an Academy Award in 2010.  In 2012 Francois scored the music for Underground: The Julian Assange Story, which premiered at the Toronto International Film Festival.  
Wally De Backer and Tetaz worked together on the Gotye albums Like Drawing Blood and Making Mirrors. He suggested Kimbra for the song Somebody that I used to Know.  Francois co-wrote Settle Down, Good Intent, 2 Way Street, and The Build Up for Kimbra's album Vows. 

In 2012 he co-wrote and produced Bertie Blackman's 4th studio album, Pope Innocent X and the soundtrack to the light sculpture Fiat Lux with Drew Berry for the Walter and Eliza Hall Institute.

Franc won the Grammy Award for Record of the Year at the 55th annual Grammy Awards for Somebody That I Used to Know(Gotye, featuring Kimbra).  The record was produced by Wally De Backer (Gotye) and engineered and mixed by Wally and Franc.

Discography

Albums
{| class="wikitable plainrowheaders" style="text-align:center;" border="1"
|+ List of albums, with selected details
! Title
! Details
|-
! scope="row" | The Motionless World of Time Between
|
 Released: 1997
 Format: CD
 Label: Dorobo (DOROBO 014)
|-
! scope="row" | Beautiful Cyborg  (with Philip Brophy & Darrin Verhagen)
|
 Released: 2002
 Format: CD
 Label: Sound Punch Records (HURT-04)
|-
! scope="row" | Under the Radar (Original Motion Picture Score)'  (with David Thrussell)
|
 Released: 2004
 Format: CD
 Label: Mana Music (CD20020)
|-
! scope="row" | Wolf Creek (Original Motion Picture Soundtrack)|
 Released: 2005
 Format: CD
 Label: Rubber Records (RUB214)
|-
! scope="row" | Rogue (Original Motion Picture Soundtrack)|
 Released: 2007
 Format: CD
 Label: Rubber Records (RUB238)
|}

Awards and nominations
ARIA Music Awards
The ARIA Music Awards is an annual awards ceremony that recognises excellence, innovation, and achievement across all genres of Australian music. They commenced in 1987. 

! 
|-
| 2006
| Wolf Creek (soundtrack)''
| Best Original Soundtrack, Cast or Show Album
| 
| 
|-
| 2011
| François Tétaz for Gotye featuring Kimbra – "Somebody That I Used to Know"
| Engineer of the Year
| 
| 
|-

References

External links
 Official site
 

APRA Award winners
ARIA Award winners
People educated at Geelong Grammar School
Living people
1970 births
Australian people of Swiss descent
Grammy Award winners